Carlo Calenda (born 9 April 1973) is an Italian business executive and politician. On 10 May 2016, he was appointed Minister of Economic Development in the government of Matteo Renzi and continued in that role in the government of Renzi's successor, Paolo Gentiloni. From 21 March to 10 May 2016, he served as Italy's Permanent Representative to the European Union. He has been serving as a Member of the European Parliament since July 2019.

Early life and business career
Calenda was born in Rome in 1973. He is the son of Fabio Calenda, a journalist, and Cristina Comencini, a film director and screenwriter, and the grandson of Luigi Comencini, a popular director of Italian comedy movies, and Giulia Grifeo di Partanna, descended from an ancient aristocratic family from Sicily.

In 1984, at the age of eleven years, he played the lead role in the Italian television miniseries Cuore, directed by his grandfather, Luigi Comencini; his voice was dubbed by Giorgio Borghetti. During his adolescence, his aristocratic background did not prevent him from joining the Italian Communist Youth Federation (FGCI).

He graduated in law at the La Sapienza University in Rome, after which he worked in various finance companies until 1998, when he became a manager of Ferrari under the presidency of Luca Cordero di Montezemolo. In the early 2000s he became the marketing manager of Sky Italia. From 2004 to 2008 Calenda served as assistant to the then president of Confindustria, Luca Cordero di Montezemolo.

Political career
At 14, Calenda joined the youth of the Italian Communist Party (PCI).

In 2009, Calenda was appointed political coordinator of Future Italy, a liberal centrist think tank founded by Montezemolo.

In 2012, he joined Civic Choice, the liberal political party of incumbent Prime Minister Mario Monti. Calenda ran in the 2013 general election, but failed to win a seat in the Chamber of Deputies.

On 2 May 2013, he was appointed Deputy Minister of Economic Development in the government of Enrico Letta, and was  later confirmed in that post in the cabinet of Letta's successor, Matteo Renzi.

On 20 January 2016, Renzi appointed him Italy's Permanent Representative to the European Union, an office he took up on March 21 that year. This appointment was criticised by both the opposition and Italian diplomats, because the office of Permanent Representative had always been held by a diplomat and not by a politician such as Calenda.

Minister of Economic Development
On 10 May 2016, following the resignation of the incumbent minister Federica Guidi, Calenda was appointed Minister of Economic Development. Calenda continued as minister in the government of Paolo Gentiloni, who succeeded Renzi when he resigned on 12 December 2016 as Prime Minister following the constitutional referendum.

Before his nomination, Calenda was widely seen as a strong supporter of free market and globalization, and he often expressed his positive view about TTIP, a proposed trade agreement between the European Union and the United States, with the aim of promoting trade and multilateral economic growth. However, his tenure as minister was characterized by his opposition to foreign multinational corporations and his defence of Italian workers. His policies became particularly evident in January 2018 when the Brazilian company Embraco, a subsidiary of the US multinational Whirlpool, announced an offshoring to shift its production from Turin to Slovakia. After weeks of tensions and protests, the Italian government and Embraco reached a deal to postpone the relocation and suspend the layoffs, permitting to reach a better agreement for workers during the following year.

On 6 March 2018, two days after the 2018 general election, which saw the defeat of Renzi's Democratic Party and a strong showing of populist forces like the Five Star Movement and the Lega, Calenda announced he would join the Democrats, stating that "we must not form a new party but work to uplift the one that already exists." He also added that the PD must be reorganized as a real leftist force and must not support any cabinet led by populist parties.

After his enter in the PD, Calenda became increasingly critical of the Third Way policies promoted by Bill Clinton in the United States, Tony Blair in the United Kingdom and more recently by Renzi in Italy, which according to him were little more than optimism and slogans and had mainly contributed to the defeats of the centre-left in the Western world. He also expressed his pessimistic view about globalization and centre-left politics, which according to him, have failed in protecting workers from offshoring and unemployment. According to him, the new left-wing must "defend the workplace and not the work itself, and must offer protection to workers." Due to his statements, Calenda was labeled by many political commentators as a workerist.

In April 2018, workers of the Italian section of Alcoa, an American industrial corporation, get a 5% of shares and a place on the board of the new company created by Swiss-based Sider Alloys' acquisition of the Sardinian aluminium mine. Calenda stated that "it will be the first case in which workers participate in the management of a company and they have fully deserved it".

Member of the European Parliament, 2019–2022

In January 2019, Calenda launched his political manifesto Siamo Europei ("We Are Europeans") with the aim of creating a joint list composed by PD and other progressive and Europeanist parties for the May's European election, in which he was elected in the North-East constituency, receiving more than 270,000 votes.

In parliament, Calenda served on the Committee on Industry, Research and Energy (ITRE) from 2019 to 2021. In addition to his committee assignments, he was a member of the parliament’s delegation for relations with Canada (2019–2021). He was also a member of the European Parliament Intergroup on Small and Medium-Sized Enterprises (SMEs).

In August 2019, tensions grew within the populist majority, due to Matteo Salvini's motion of no-confidence on Prime Minister Giuseppe Conte. On 20 August, Conte resigned his post to President Mattarella and on the following day, the national direction of the PD officially opened to a cabinet with the Five Star Movement (M5S), based on pro-Europeanism, green economy, sustainable development, fight against economic inequality and a new immigration policy. On 28 August, PD's leader Nicola Zingaretti announced at the Quirinal Palace his favorable position on keeping Giuseppe Conte at the head of the new government, and on same day, Mattarella summoned Conte to the Quirinal Palace for the 29 August to give him the task of forming a new cabinet. Calenda strongly opposed the new government, stating the PD had renounced to represent the reformists, so it became necessary to found a "liberal-progressive" movement. Calenda exited from the PD and on 5 September 2019, while the new government was being sworn in, he officially announced the foundation of his new movement. On 21 November 2019, the new party, which was named Action (Azione), was officially founded.

On 18 October 2020, Calenda announced his intention to run as Mayor of Rome in the 2021 municipal election; he eventually lost against Roberto Gualtieri. In November 2021, Calenda left the S&D parliamentary group and instead joined the Renew Europe group.

2022 general election

Following the resignation of Mario Draghi as Prime Minister of Italy and the call for a snap election, Calenda's Action party signed on 2 August an alliance with Enrico Letta's PD, the head of the centre-left coalition. On 6 August, the PD signed another pact with the eco-socialist Greens and Left Alliance (AVS), formed by Green Europe (EV) and Italian Left (SI), which never supported Draghi's government. This caused tensions between Letta and Calenda. The latter, being a strong supporter of economic liberalism and nuclear power, considered impossible a coalition between his own party and the red–green alliance. On 7 August, Calenda broke the alliance with the PD. On 11 August, Matteo Renzi's Italia Viva (IV) and A signed an agreement to create a centrist alliance named Action – Italia Viva (A–IV) led by Calenda himself. 

Despite Draghi's dismissal, Calenda said they would push for Draghi to remain as prime minister, should A–IV win enough seats. The list also ran a pro-nuclear power and pro-regasification campaign as solutions for the ongoing energy crisis. In the general election on 25 September, the so-called Third Pole obtained 21 seats in the Chamber of Deputies and 9 seats in the Senate of the Republic, having polled about 8%. On 3 October, Calenda announced that the two parties will form joint parliamentary group in the next parliament and start a federation between the two movements.

Electoral history

Authored books

References

External links
 

1973 births
Civic Choice politicians
Democratic Party (Italy) politicians
Italian atheists
Government ministers of Italy
Living people
MEPs for Italy 2019–2024
Permanent Representatives of Italy to the European Union
Politicians from Rome
Renzi Cabinet
Sapienza University of Rome alumni